was a village located in Shimokita District in northern Aomori Prefecture, Japan.

Wakinosawa Village was founded in 1889 from the merger the hamlets of Wakinosawa with neighboring Ozawa.

On March 14, 2005, Wakinosawa, along with the neighboring towns of Kawauchi and Ōhata (all from Shimokita District), was merged into the neighboring and expanded city of Mutsu, and thus no longer exists as an independent municipality.

Located at the southwestern tip of Shimokita Peninsula facing Mutsu Bay, the village of Wakinosawa had an economy based primarily on commercial fishing.

At the time of its merger, the village had an estimated population of 2,461 and a population density of 42.06 persons per km2. The total area was 58.59 km2.

Wakinosawa was served by Route 338 (Japan) highway, but had no railway service. Ferries connect the fishing port with Aomori and Kanita on the opposite side of Mutsu Bay.

Climate

References

Dissolved municipalities of Aomori Prefecture